Hilarographa soleana is a species of moth of the family Tortricidae. It is found on Seram in  Indonesia.

The wingspan is about 17.5 mm. The ground colour of the forewings is creamish, slightly mixed with orange in the form of lines extending from the dorsum. The hindwings are brownish with a broad, dark brown apical third.

Etymology
The specific epithet refers to the type locality.

References

Moths described in 2009
Hilarographini